Ilikovo (İlek) is a rural locality (a village) in Baymurzinsky Selsoviet, Mishkinsky District, Bashkortostan, Russia. The population was 156 as of 2010. There are 2 streets.

Geography 
Ilikovo is located 56 km northwest of Mishkino (the district's administrative centre) by road. Ishimovo is the nearest rural locality.

References 

Rural localities in Mishkinsky District